This list of geophysics awards is an index to articles on notable awards for contributions to geophysics, the branch of natural science concerned with the physical processes and physical properties of the Earth and its surrounding space environment, and the use of quantitative methods for their analysis.
The list gives the country of the organization that sponsors the award, but the awards are not necessarily limited to people from that country.

International

Americas

Asia

Europe

See also
 Lists of awards
 Lists of science and technology awards
 List of earth sciences awards

References

 
Geophysics